The Vidovdan Constitution was the first constitution of the Kingdom of Serbs, Croats and Slovenes. It was approved by the Constitutional Assembly on 28 June 1921 despite the opposition boycotting the vote. The Constitution is named after the feast of St. Vitus (Vidovdan), a Serbian Orthodox holiday. The Constitution required a simple majority to pass. Out of 419 representatives, 223 voted for, 35 voted against and 161 abstained.

The Constitution was in effect until King Alexander proclaimed his 6 January Dictatorship on that date in 1929.

Adoption 
The process of adopting the Vidovdan Constitution will reveal major political conflicts in the new state. Although there were earlier plans to adopt a Constitution (see the Guidelines, the Corfu Declaration, the Geneva Agreement), the Constitution was eventually adopted by a narrow majority and overriding on a national basis.

For
Democratic Party
People's Radical Party
Yugoslav Muslim Organization 
Alliance of Agrarians
Džemijet

Against
Yugoslav Social-Democratic Party
Yugoslav Republican Party
Foreign Minister Ante Trumbić

Boycotted
Communist Party of Yugoslavia - left assembly in June
Croatian Republican Peasant Party - boycotted assembly since 1920 elections
Slovenian People's Party - left assembly in June
Croatian People's Party - left assembly in June
Croatian Union - left assembly in May

Provisions 

The SCS Kingdom is designated as a constitutional, parliamentary and hereditary monarchy, whose language is Serbo-Croatian-Slovenian . A unitary system was established (the theory of the tribe people). The proclaimed principles of separation of powers were deformed by later provisions, but in principle parliamentarianism existed.

Legislative power was shared by the King and the National Assembly. The king had a wide range of powers - legislative initiative, sanction, promulgation of laws as well as initiative and consent to change the Constitution. He also had the right to declare war and conclude peace. He also possessed extensive powers regarding the appointment of judges and the dissolution of the assembly. In addition, he had the classic powers of the head of state.

The National Assembly was a unicameral representative body. According to the Vidovdan Constitution, citizens had political rights - voting rights, association rights, assembly and collusion. Voting rights were limited by the relatively high age bracket and were not enjoyed by women. For women, the Constitution provided for the passage of legislation that would address the issue of their suffrage, but it was not enacted throughout the life of the kingdom. Each member of the assembly had the right of legislative initiative, parliamentary question, interpellation. In the event of a change of Constitution, the Assembly dissolved and elected a new one, which had the meaning of a hidden constitutional referendum.

The Council of Ministers was accountable to both the King and the National Assembly (Orleans parliamentarism) and the ministers did not have to be MPs. There was also the criminal and civil liability of the ministers, with a special State Court. The Council of Ministers had the right to legislate, to issue regulations for the implementation of the law and those with legal force in special cases.

The courts were independent and organized as first instance, appellate and cassation courts (based in Zagreb). Special administrative courts (State Council and Main Control) were also envisaged.

A large number of socio-economic rights were prescribed, as well as a special Economic Council.

The units of territorial-administrative division were districts, districts, districts and municipalities.

Alternative proposals

Croatian Republican Peasant Party
The Croatian Republican Peasant Party adopted its Constitution of the neutral peasant republic of Croatia in Zagreb on 1 April 1921.

Croatian Union
The Croatian Union had proposed a confederation of the kingdom into six entities:
Serbia 
Croatia 
Montenegro
Bosnia and Herzegovina
Vojvodina
Slovenia

Aftermath
On 30 June, an editorial in the People's Radical Party's journal Samouprava stated, "This year's Vidovdan restored an empire to us". On 21 July, the Minister of the Interior and member of the People's Radical Party Milorad Drašković was assassinated in Delnice by a group of communists.

The viability of the constitution dominated the 1923 parliamentary elections.

The Croatian Peasant Party did not accept the legitimacy of the constitution. After the 1925 elections, entry into the government was offered to the party by Nikola Pašić. The Croatian Peasant Party accepted and recognized the constitution. Leader Stjepan Radić  was realesed from prison, along with other party officials.

References

 
 

1921 documents
1921 in Yugoslavia
Constitutions of Yugoslavia
1921 in politics
June 1921 events
1921 in law